Beard is an English surname of Anglo-Saxon and Old French origin, first recorded in the Domesday Book.

Notable people sharing the surname "Beard" 
 Adrien Beard, American voice actor
 Al Beard, American basketball player
 Alana Beard, American basketball player
 Amanda Beard, American Olympic swimmer
 Andrew Jackson Beard, American inventor
 Annette Beard, American R&B singer, of Martha and the Vandellas
 Anson M. Beard, American football player
 Arthur Beard, British footballer
 Bert Beard, Australian rules footballer
 Bertram Beard, English cricketer
 Butch Beard, American basketball player and coach
 Charles A. Beard, influential American historian
 Chris Beard (born 1957), American electric blues musician
 Clarke Beard, American athlete
 Colin Beard, Australian rules footballer
 Daniel Carter Beard, founder of the Sons of Daniel Boone
 David Beard, Australian volleyball player
 David Breed Beard (1922–1998), American space physicist
 DeLawrence Beard, American judge
 Don Beard, New Zealand cricketer
 Dympna Beard, Australian politician
 Ed Beard, saloon keeper in the American Old West
 Ed Beard (football player), American football player
 Edward Beard, U.S. congressman from Rhode Island
 Elspeth Beard, English woman motorcyclist
 Emma Beard, British singer
 Frank Beard (golfer), American golfer
 Frank Beard (musician), drummer in the American rock band ZZ Top
 Frederic Beard, English choirmaster in Australia
 George Miller Beard, American neurologist who coined the term "neurasthenia"
 Gordon Beard, Canadian politician
 Graeme Beard, Australian cricketer
 Hazel Beard, American politician
 Henry Beard, founder of National Lampoon magazine
 James Beard, American chef and food writer
 James Henry Beard, American painter
 Jim Beard, American jazz pianist
 John Beard (disambiguation), several people
 John Beard (artist) (born 1943), Welsh artist and painter
 John Beard (colonial administrator) (died 1685), Chief Agent and Governor of Bengal
 John Beard (embryologist) (1858–1924), Scottish embryologist and anatomist
 John Beard (news anchor) (born 1945), American newscaster and Arrested Development actor
 John Beard (politician) (1797–1876), American politician
 John Beard (tenor) ( 1716–1791), English singer of Handel oratorios
 John Beard (trade unionist) (1871–1950), British politician
 John F. Beard (1822–1891), Wisconsin legislator
 John Relly Beard (1800–1876), English Unitarian minister
 John Stanley Beard (1916–2011), British Australian ecologist
 John Stanley Coombe Beard (1890–1970), English architect
 John W. Beard (born 1951), Iowan politician
 John William Beard (1920–2006), Californian politician
 Kevin Beard, American football player
 Malcolm Beard, English footballer
 Malcolm E. Beard (1919–2019), American politician
 Mark Beard (disambiguation), several people
 Mark Beard (footballer) (born 1974), English football defender
 Mark Beard (artist) (born 1956), American artist
 Mark Beard (racing driver) (1948–2021), American driver and team owner
 Mary Beard (disambiguation), several people
 Mary Beard (classicist) (born 1955), British literary critic and journalist
 Mary Beard (nursing) (1876–1946), director of the American Red Cross Nursing Service
 Mary Ritter Beard (1876–1958), American historian, women's suffrage activist
 Mat Beard (disambiguation), several people (various spellings)
 Mat Beard, US state legislator (16th Oklahoma Legislature#House of Representatives)  
 Mathew Beard (1870–1985), oldest African-American supercentenarian
 Matthew "Stymie" Beard (1925–1981), American child actor in Our Gang
 Matt Beard (born 1978), English football manager for Bristol City W.F.C.
 Matthew Beard (English actor) (born 1989)
 Nigel Beard, British politician
 Pat Beard, American politician
 Paul Beard (disambiguation), several people
 Paul Beard (spiritualist), British president of the College of Psychic Studies
 Paul Beard (violinist), leader of the London Philharmonic and BBC Symphony orchestras
 Percy Beard, American track and field athlete
 Peter Beard (1938–2020), American photographer and artist
 Peter Beard (politician) (born 1935), Australian politician
 Peter Beard, mayor of Reading, England
 Peter Hill Beard (1938–2020), American photographer
 Philip Beard, American novelist
 Ralph Beard, American basketball player
 Ralph Beard (baseball), American Major League Baseball player
 Randal Beard, American engineer
 Richard Beard (disambiguation), several people
 Richard Beard (author) (born 1967), English writer
 Richard Beard (courtier) ( 1540), English courtier
 Richard Beard (photographer), English photographer
 Robin Beard, US congressman from Tennessee
 Santonio Beard (1980-2022), American football player
 Sarah E. Beard (1921–2012), American medical researcher
 Stephanie Beard, Canadian actress
 Tanoka Beard, American basketball player
 Thomas Beard (died 1632), English clergyman and theologian
 Thomas P. Beard (1837–1918), African American politician
 Trevor Beard, British-Australian medical doctor
 William Beard (disambiguation), several people
 William Beard (bone collector) (1772–1868), of Banwell, Somerset
 William Beard (cricketer), New Zealand cricketer
 William E. Beard (1873–1950), American naval historian
 William Holbrook Beard (1824–1900), American painter
 William P. "Bull Moose" Beard, publisher of Abbeville Scimitar

English-language surnames